All Y'all may refer to:

"All Y'all" (song), a 2001 song by Timbaland & Magoo
All Y'all (album), a 2007 album by Travis Morrison Hellfighters